Ira Sylvester Davis (born September 25, 1936, in Philadelphia, Pennsylvania) is a retired American triple jumper.  He represented the United States at three Olympics; 1956, 1960 and 1964.  He made the finals each time, his best showing was fourth place in 1960, missing a bronze medal by 2 cm.  He was the winner of the Olympic Trials each time, setting the Trials record in 1956 and twice in 1960.  1956 was also the American record, set as a 19-year-old college freshman.  He was a four time National Champion, winning in 1958-60 and again in 1964.

Davis competed for Overbrook High School where he was a teammate of Wilt Chamberlain on both the basketball and track teams; and La Salle University.  Davis was also a credible sprinter, winning the 100-yard dash at the IC4A Championships and the Penn Relays in 1958.

Davis was a 1956 initiate of the Delta Eta chapter of Kappa Alpha Psi fraternity.

References

Living people
1936 births
American male triple jumpers
Athletes (track and field) at the 1956 Summer Olympics
Athletes (track and field) at the 1960 Summer Olympics
Athletes (track and field) at the 1964 Summer Olympics
Athletes (track and field) at the 1959 Pan American Games
Track and field athletes from Philadelphia
Olympic track and field athletes of the United States
Pan American Games track and field athletes for the United States